Alejandro "Álex" Pozo Pozo (born 22 February 1999) is a Spanish professional footballer who plays for UD Almería and the Spain national team. Mainly a right winger, he can also play as a right back.

Club career
Born in Huévar del Aljarafe, Seville, Andalusia, Pozo played youth football for Sevilla FC. On 21 August 2016, aged only 17, he made his professional debut with the reserves by coming on as a late substitute for Ivi in a 3–3 Segunda División home draw against Girona FC.

Pozo scored his first professional goal on 22 October 2016, netting the equalizer in a 2–1 away win against CD Numancia. On 20 August 2018, after suffering relegation with the B-team, he joined fellow second division side Granada CF on a one-year loan deal.

Pozo was regularly utilized for the Nazaríes during the campaign, contributing with four goals in 30 appearances as his side returned to the top tier. On 27 August 2019, he renewed his contract with Sevilla until 2023, being definitely promoted to the main squad.

Pozo made his La Liga debut on 29 September 2019, replacing Lucas Ocampos in a 3–2 home win against Real Sociedad. The following 15 January, after featuring rarely, he was loaned to fellow top-tier club RCD Mallorca for the remainder of the season.

On 5 October 2020, Pozo was loaned to fellow top tier side SD Eibar for the 2020–21 campaign, along with teammate Bryan Gil. On 31 August of the following year, he moved to UD Almería in the second tier on a one-year loan deal, with a buyout clause.

On 6 June 2022, after Almería's promotion to the top tier as champions, Pozo signed a permanent five-year contract with the club.

International career
Due to the isolation of some national team players following the positive COVID-19 test of Sergio Busquets, Spain's under-21 squad were called up for the international friendly against Lithuania on 8 June 2021. Pozo made his senior debut in the match as Spain won 4–0.

Career statistics

Club

International

Honours
Sevilla
UEFA Europa League: 2019–20

Almería
Segunda División: 2021–22

References

External links

1999 births
Living people
People from Aljarafe
Sportspeople from the Province of Seville
Spanish footballers
Footballers from Andalusia
Association football midfielders
La Liga players
Segunda División players
Sevilla Atlético players
Granada CF footballers
Sevilla FC players
RCD Mallorca players
SD Eibar footballers
UD Almería players
Spain youth international footballers
Spain under-21 international footballers
Spain international footballers
UEFA Europa League winning players